Ivan Manojlović may refer to:

Ivan Manojlović (actor), Serbian actor
Ivan Manojlović (politician), Serbian politician